The 1998 Stella Artois Championships was a men's tennis tournament played on grass courts at the Queen's Club in London in the United Kingdom and was part of the World Series of the 1998 ATP Tour. It was the 96th edition of the tournament and was held from 8 June through 15 June 1998. Scott Draper won the singles title.

Finals

Singles

 Scott Draper defeated  Laurence Tieleman 7–6(7–5), 6–4
 It was Draper's only title of the year and the 1st of his career. He was the lowest ranked player ever to win the tournament, while Tieleman was the lowest ranked finalist.

Doubles

 Todd Woodbridge /  Mark Woodforde vs.  Jonas Björkman /  Patrick Rafter 
 The doubles final was cancelled due to bad weather. This was the second time in the Open Era that a final at the Championships had been cancelled, the first being the washout of both the singles and doubles finals in 1968.

References

External links
 Official website
 ATP tournament profile

 
Stella Artois Championships
Queen's Club Championships
Stella Artois Championships
Stella Artois Championships
Stella Artois Championships